The Y-49 Cable (also known as the Long Island Sound Cable) is an undersea and underground high voltage electric transmission cable between Westchester County and Long Island via the Long Island Sound and Hempstead Harbor in New York, United States. It is operated by the New York Power Authority.

Description 
The Y-49 Cable travels between the Sprain Brook Substation in Yonkers, Westchester County (operated by Consolidated Edison) to the East Garden City Substation in Uniondale, Nassau County (operated by NYPA).

Y-49 is one of five undersea transmission lines connecting between Long Island and the Continental United States as of 2021 (four of which are operated by NYPA).

History 
The cable began operating in May 1991, and has a capacity of 675 megawatts.

In 2014, the cable was damaged by an anchor from a boat. The incident caused roughly 66,000 gallons of cable insulation fluid to be released into Hempstead Harbor.

As of 2021, there are proposals to upgrade the cable in order to increase its capacity.

See also 

 Cross Sound Cable
Y-50 Cable

References 

Long Island Sound
Energy infrastructure completed in 1991
Energy infrastructure on Long Island, New York